The Hindu Friday Review Music Festival is an annual music festival held in Chennai, India.

History
The festival was started in Chennai in 2005.

The festival
The festival is held every year in Chennai. It was also held in 2010 at Hyderabad, Bangalore and Coimbatore.

References

External links
 

Music festivals established in 2005
Music festivals in India
Classical music festivals in India
Culture of Chennai
2005 establishments in Tamil Nadu
Events in Chennai